Adrar District is a district of Adrar Province, Algeria. With a population of 88,266, it is the most populated district in the province.

Communes
The district is further divided into 3 communes:
Adrar
Bouda
Ouled Ahmed Timmi

References

Districts of Adrar Province